Simon Cameron School is a historic school building located at Harrisburg, Dauphin County, Pennsylvania.  It was built in 1896, and is a two-story, brick and frame building, with a hip roof covered in slate shingles. It sits on a brownstone foundation. It is 12 bays wide and 8 bays deep, with an 8 bay wide, 6 bay deep rear section added in 1900.  It is named for Pennsylvania politician Simon Cameron (1799–1889).

It was added to the National Register of Historic Places in 1986.

References

Buildings and structures in Harrisburg, Pennsylvania
School buildings on the National Register of Historic Places in Pennsylvania
School buildings completed in 1900
National Register of Historic Places in Harrisburg, Pennsylvania
1896 establishments in Pennsylvania